Double Dan is a 1924 crime novel by the British writer Edgar Wallace. It released in the United States under the alternative title of Diana of Kara Kara.

In 1927 it was adapted into a stage play of the same name by Wallace, which was poorly received by critics and closed after nine performances at London's Savoy Theatre.

References

Bibliography
 Kiddle, Charles. A guide to the first editions of Edgar Wallace. Ivory Head Press, 1981.

1924 British novels
Novels by Edgar Wallace
British crime novels